Mothusi Cooper (born 19 July 1997) is a Motswana footballer playing as a midfielder for Botswana Premier League team Township Rollers. He is also a full Botswana international.

International career
Cooper made his senior debut in 2019 under interim manager Mogomotsi Mpote and was an integral part of the squad which reached the 2019 COSAFA Cup final. In November 2019 he was one of four Botswana international players dropped from the national team by coach Adel Amrouche after they had been drinking alcohol in camp. However, Cooper apologized to the manager and federation and was added to the 2021 Africa Cup of Nations qualification squad.

Honours

Club
Botswana Premier League:1
2018-19

References

1997 births
Living people
Botswana international footballers
Botswana footballers
Association football midfielders
Township Rollers F.C. players
Extension Gunners FC players